Mogens Eskild Snogdahl (born 2 June 1926) is a Danish rower. Snogdahl was born in Copenhagen in 1926. He was the younger brother to Jørn Snogdahl. He competed at the 1952 Summer Olympics in Helsinki with the men's eight where they were eliminated in the semi-finals repêchage.

References

External links
  

1926 births
Possibly living people
Danish male rowers
Olympic rowers of Denmark
Rowers at the 1952 Summer Olympics
Rowers from Copenhagen
European Rowing Championships medalists